Jamia Markaz (also called Markaz or Sunni Markaz) is an Islamic University running under the Markazu Saqafathi Sunniyya at Kozhikode in Kerala, India. The Markaz is located east of Kozhikode city. The foundation stone was laid by the Saudi Arabian Islamic scholar Muhammad Alawi al-Maliki in presence of Kanniyath Ahmed Musliyar and E. K. Aboobacker Musliyar. 

Markaz has started a branch in Dubai under the supervision of Islamic Affairs and Charitable Activities Department of Dubai (Markaz, Dubai also called Dubai Markaz) with various courses in Islamic studies.

Management
Markazu Saqafathi Sunniyya is an Indian-based Non-governmental organization registered under Societies Registration Act, 1860) at Kozhikode.

Welfare services
Markaz provides financial aid to poor students for further studies. There is a special fund for assisting the students who aspire to study here and abroad, top scorers attend universities in Egypt, Russia, etc.  Markaz sponsors medical and engineering students studying in Kerala and other states like Karnataka, Uttar Pradesh, and Delhi. There is a special welfare outlet functioning in the capital city, Delhi.

Markaz gives degrees (sanad) in Islamic studies as Maulvi Fazil Saqafi and Maulavi Kamil Saqafi for P.G in Islamic Studies also called Saqafi.

International relations and Affiliation
Al Azhar University of Cairo has extended its recognition to courses taught by the Markazu Saqafati Sunniyya.
 Turkey - Fatih University
 Malaysia - IIUM
 UAE - Al Qasimia University
 Egypt - Al Azhar University
 Jordan - World Islamic Sciences and Education University
 UK - The Islamic Manuscript Association
 Yemen - Dar al-Mustafa

Ruby Jubilee

Markaz Ruby Jubilee is the fortieth annual conference of Jamia Markaz. As part of the ruby jubilee celebrations, Markaz conducted a number of seminars and conferences. That discussed a large number of issues pertain to the crisis of humanity and Muslim world. It was held during 4 January 2018 and 7th of the same month.
 Cultural conference
 Inaugural Conference
 Sheikh Zayed International Peace Conference
 National Integration Conference
 Inauguration of Queens’ Land
 International Islamic Scholars’ Conference

See also
 Sheikh Abubakr Ahmad
 Karwan-I-Islami
 Al-Azhar University

References

External links
 

1978 establishments in Kerala
Educational institutions established in 1978
Islamic universities and colleges in India
Islam in Kerala
Universities and colleges in Kozhikode district
Markaz
Kozhikode east